Gwen Noel Sebastian is an American country music singer-songwriter. Sebastian was signed to Lofton Creek Records in 2009 and released two singles for the label. In 2012, she was a contestant on the second season of The Voice but lost in the battles.

Biography
Gwen Sebastian was born in the small farming town of Hebron, North Dakota. After receiving her college degree, Sebastian attended nursing school, but dropped out after only one semester to relocate to Nashville, Tennessee and pursue her music career. She signed a recording deal with Lofton Creek Records in October 2009, and shortly thereafter Country Weekly named Sebastian among its pick of talented new artists to watch in 2010.

Sebastian's first single, "Hard Rain", was released to country radio on October 12, 2009. The song received a "thumbs up" from Engine 145 reviewer Sam Gazdziak, who described it as a "smartly written song [with] solid vocals."

In October 2009, Sebastian re-released a Christmas album titled Christmas in July on Lofton Creek/Open Road Records which featured some original Christmas music as well as covers of holiday standards. On May 25, 2010, she digitally released a 6-song EP titled V.I.P. The title track, "V.I.P. (Barefoot Girl)", was nationally released to country radio, along with a video.

Sebastian sang the National Anthem for the New York Yankees' Spring Training game against the Detroit Tigers in Tampa, Florida on March 28, 2010, and received a congratulatory hug from actor Richard Gere who was in attendance.

On June 8, 2010, Sebastian participated in the 4th Annual Country Weekly Fashion Show and Concert, held at the Wildhorse Saloon in Nashville. The event raised funds and awareness for Musicians on Call, a nonprofit organization with the mission of bringing music to the bedsides of patients in healthcare facilities.

Sebastian was a contestant on the second season of NBC's reality singing competition The Voice. Sebastian chose fellow country singer Blake Shelton to be her vocal coach for the show. Sebastian worked with Shelton and Miranda Lambert for her battle round, but was eliminated just before the live shows. After being eliminated, Sebastian toured with Shelton and Lambert. As of 2019, Sebastian is still part of Lambert's band, most recently accompanying her on the 2018 Livin' Like Hippies Tour and providing backing vocal on 2014's Platinum and 2016's The Weight of These Wings.

The Voice

Discography

Albums

Holiday albums

Extended plays

Singles

Guest singles

Music videos

References

External links 

Gwen Sebastian – Cadillac- Single Review – Building Our Own Nashville
 Gwen Sebastian – Cadillac- Single Review

American country singer-songwriters
American rock singers
21st-century American singers
American women country singers
Living people
Lofton Creek Records artists
The Voice (franchise) contestants
1974 births
Musicians from Nashville, Tennessee
People from Morton County, North Dakota
Singer-songwriters from Tennessee
21st-century American women singers
Country musicians from Tennessee
Singer-songwriters from North Dakota